State of Lunacy is the debut album by the British hip hop group Rhyme Asylum, released in 2008. It includes guest appearances from Diabolic, Copywrite and Reain.

Track listing 
 "Explorers of the Mind (Intro)" – 0:57
 "Ground Zero" – 3:37
 "Straight Jacket Part I" (featuring Reain) – 3:15
 "The Awakening (Skit)" – 0:58
 "Lost" – 5:05
 "Multiplicity" – 4:15
 "Smoke Screens & Pipe Dreams" – 3:23
 "Unreasonable" (featuring Diabolic) – 4:49
 "Poison Penmanship" – 3:22
 "Test of Faith" – 4:00
 "Stark Raving Genius" – 5:26
 "Attitude Problem" (featuring Copywrite) – 4:17
 "Straight Jacket Part II" (featuring Reain) – 3:03
 "Holding On" – 4:27
 "Shadow People (Skit)" – 0:54
 "Iller Instinct" – 4:45
 "Multiplicity" (remix) – 3:53

Credits 
 All vocals edited and sequenced by Psiklone
 Scratches performed by DJ Supernatural
 All scratches recorded, edited and arranged by Psiklone
 Front cover artwork and design by Skam2?
 Front cover colour by Joel Benjamin
 Photography by Nathan Tribble
 All other artwork and design by Psiklone

Production 
Executive produced by Rhyme Asylum. All tracks produced by Leatherface except for
 S-Type – track 6
 Leatherface and Budgie – track 16

2008 debut albums